Waterlines is the second full-length album released by the Finnish power metal/hard rock band Excalion in 2007.

Track listing
"Wingman" - 3:57
"Life on Fire" - 4:13
"Losing Time" - 4:16
"Ivory Tower" - 3:49
"I Failed You" - 5:02
"Arriving As the Dark" - 3:27
"Streams of Madness" - 3:53
"Delta Sunrise" - 5:28
"Between the Lines" - 4:26
"Soaking Ground" - 6:30
"Yövartio" (European Bonus Track) - 3:25 (The song "Arriving as the Dark" with Finnish vocals)
"Access Denied" (Japanese Bonus Track) - 3:46

Personnel
Jarmo Pääkkönen - Vocals
Vesa Nupponen - Guitars
Jarmo Myllyvirta - Keyboards
Tero Vaaja - Bass
Henri Pirkkalainen - Drums

References

2007 albums
Excalion albums
Limb Music albums